Edemir Cláudio Marques, commonly known as Cláudio or Cláudio Marques (born 18 February 1950), is a retired football midfielder who won the Campeonato Paranaense seven times as a player with Coritiba Foot Ball Club. He is now a football manager and television commentator.

Career
Born in Santos, São Paulo, Cláudio Marques playing professional football with Coritiba Foot Ball Club in 1969. He won the Campeonato Paranaense five consecutive times with Coritiba before joining Sport Club Corinthians Paulista for two seasons. He won the Campeonato Paulista with Corinthians and then returned to Coritiba where he won the Campeonato Paranense twice more. He also won the 1973 Torneio do Povo with Coritiba.

In 1979, Cláudio Marques moved to Mexico to play for Atlético Potosino.

After he retired from playing, Cláudio Marques became a football coach. He led Sinop Futebol Clube to two Campeonato Mato-Grossense titles in 1998 and 1999. He managed Rio Branco Sport Club in 2009, and was appointed manager of Fast Clube in June 2012.

References

External links

1950 births
Living people
Brazilian footballers
Brazilian football managers
Sportspeople from Santos, São Paulo
Brazilian expatriate footballers
Campeonato Brasileiro Série A players
Liga MX players
Campeonato Brasileiro Série A managers
Coritiba Foot Ball Club players
Sport Club Corinthians Paulista players
San Luis F.C. players
Expatriate footballers in Mexico
Sinop Futebol Clube managers
Coritiba Foot Ball Club managers
Rio Branco Sport Club managers
Nacional Fast Clube managers
Association football midfielders